Toriko is an anime series adapted from the manga of the same title by Mitsutoshi Shimabukuro, produced by Toei Animation and directed by Akifumi Zako. The series follows the adventures of Toriko and Komatsu as they search for rare, diverse foods to complete a full-course meal.

The series ran on Fuji Television from April 3, 2011, to March 30, 2014, and was released on DVD in 25 compilations by Happinet Pictures between August 2, 2011 and July 2, 2014. The series' debut episode was part of a cross-over special between Toriko and One Piece. The anime was licensed by Funimation for a simulcast streaming and a home media release in North America.

The series uses twelve pieces of theme music: two opening themes and ten ending themes. The ending themes are "Satisfaction" performed by F.T. Island for episodes 2 to 26, "Deli-Deli Delicious" performed by Sea A for episodes 27 to 38, "Sabrina" performed by Leo Ieiri for episodes 39 to 50, "Love Chase" performed by Tomohisa Yamashita for episodes 52 to 63,  performed by Hyadain for episodes 64 to 75, "Lovely Fruit" performed by Nana Mizuki for episodes 76 to 87,  performed by Jun Sky Walker(s) for episodes 88 to 98,  performed by Salley for episodes 100 to 111,  performed by The Dresscodes for episodes 112 to 123, "Believe in Yourself!" performed by Palet for episodes 124 to 135, and  performed by Rurika Yokoyama for the rest of the series.

Series overview

Episode list

Season 1

Season 2

Season 3

Media release

Japanese
Happinet Pictures distributed the episodes in 25 volumes in DVD format across Japan.

English
In North America, Funimation released the first 50 episodes in four parts from January 22 to May 7, 2013; they were reissued in two collections from August 26 to November 4, 2014. In Australasia, Madman Entertainment released the episodes in three collections from May 22 to June 19, 2013.

Notes

References
General

Specific

Toriko